Cloten can refer to:
 Cloten of Dyfed and Brycheiniog
 A character in Shakespeare's play Cymbeline
Cloten (Cornwall) the King of Cornwall